Loxotaphrus is a genus of sea snails, marine gastropod mollusks in the family Cancellariidae, the nutmeg snails.

Species
Species within the genus Loxotaphrus include:

 Loxotaphrus deshayesii (Duval, 1841)
 Loxotaphrus limpusi Beu & Verhecken, 2000
 Loxotaphrus rosadoi Beu & Verhecken, 2000

References

Cancellariidae